Yemaindi Ee Vela (English: What happened this moment?) is a 2010 Indian Tollywood romantic drama film, starring Varun Sandesh, Nisha Aggarwal, Nisha Shah and Shashank. The film was directed and written by Sampath Nandi. The movie was a commercial success and resuscitated Varun Sandesh's then-declining career, completing a fifty-day run in 32 centers. It was later remade in Tamil as Ishtam, with Nisha Aggarwal reprising her role from the original and Vimal playing the role portrayed by Varun Sandesh.

Plot
Seenu (Varun Sandesh) is going for his second marriage and he meets Nimisha (Nisha Shah). Avantika (Nisha Aggarwal) is also going for her second marriage and meets Yuva (Shashank). Both of them decide to tell their partners about their past. The flashback reveals how Seenu and Avantika meet each other, fall in love, get married against their parents wishes and in no time, get separated as well. As their marriages to their new partners approach, all four want to cancel their marriages on their wedding day. Seenu and Avantika cancel their respective marriages with the consent of their new partners and reconcile to lead a happy life together.

Cast
 Varun Sandesh as Seenu
 Nisha Aggarwal as Avantika
 Shashank as Yuva
 Nisha Shah as Nimisha
 M S Narayana
 Vennela Kishore as Seenu's friend
 Pragathi as Seenu's mother
 Jhansi as Avantika's aunt

Box office
The film was declared as Super hit worldwide by 4/5 rating's by critics. The film collected  in a fifty-day run at box office.

Soundtrack

The audio Launch was held on 11 October 2010 at Hotel Park in Hyderabad. M.L. Kumar Chowdary, Posani Krishna Murali, Allari Naresh, Nani, Tanish, Kajal Aggarwal, Nisha Aggarwal, Chakri, Vennela Kishore, Shashank, Kodi Ramakrishna, Sampath Nandi and others graced the Function.

References

External links
 

2010 films
Telugu films remade in other languages
2010 directorial debut films
2010s Telugu-language films
Films directed by Sampath Nandi